T.O.P. is the second Korean studio album by South Korean boy band Shinhwa. It was released on April 15, 1999, by SM Entertainment. The album title T.O.P. stands for Twinkling Of Paradise.

Track listing
Information is adapted from the liner notes of T.O.P.:

Music video
The music video for "T.O.P." shows the six Shinhwa members in white suits with a bright fantasy-like back-drop.

The music video for "Yo!" tells the story of vocalist Lee Minwoo, as a trouble-maker boy who falls in love with a girl, played by Kim Bo-mi.

Reception
The album garnered much success, climbing the charts quickly (debuting at #4 and peaking at #3). Although they promoted their first album well, Shinhwa did not do many promotions for their second album, and instead began working on their third album. Despite the lack of promotions, the single "T.O.P." was a success, and spent 24 weeks on the charts before it dropped. "T.O.P." represented Shinhwa's first significant commercial success and was noted for its use of Tchaikovsky's "Swan Lake" music. Years after its release, "T.O.P." has been performed on television with its original choreography by groups such as Girls' Generation, Spica, Super Junior, and BTS.

The second single "Yo!" collected seven number one wins on live music programs, a record it held until "This Love" from their eleventh album The Classic, won eight first place wins in 2013. This record was broken again by "Sniper" from their twelfth album WE, won ten first place wins in 2015.

Chart

Release history

Personnel
Information is adapted from the liner notes of T.O.P.:

Album production
 Lee Soo-man - producer
 KAT - recording engineer
 Kim Young-hoon - recording engineer
 Yeo Doo-hyeon - recording engineer
 Jin-hoon (BLS) - mastering engineer
 Hong Hyeon-ah - mastering engineer

Electric guitar
 Groovie.K - "Yo! (악동보고서)", "T.O.P. (Twinkling of Paradise)", "Nothing", "To. G", "Grief", "Return"
 Oh Han-sol - "Cycle"
 Sam Lee - "Desire"
 Lee Geun-hyeong - "Forever With You"

Bass guitar
 Lee Tae-woon - "Yo! (악동보고서)", "Cycle", "Nothing"
 Shin Hyeon-kwon - "Desire"

References

1999 albums
Shinhwa albums
SM Entertainment albums